Zach Steinberger (born May 10, 1992) is an American former professional soccer player.

Career

Youth and college
Growing up in Southern California, Steinberger spent time with various youth soccer teams in the area before joining IMG Academy in Bradenton, Florida.  He then tried his luck in Europe, spending time in the youth ranks for Slovakian club MFK Košice and German side Karlsruher SC.

After two years in Europe, Steinbgerger returned to the States to play college soccer.  Steinberger spent his entire college career at Butler University between 2011 and 2014, where he made 65 appearances, scored 14 goals, and had 15 assists for the Bulldogs.  He was named 2013 First Team All-Big East and 2013 Big East All-Tournament.

While at Butler, Steinberger also played for the Michigan Bucks in the Premier Development League between 2012 and 2014.

Professional

Houston Dynamo 
On January 15, 2015, Steinberger was selected in the first round (8th overall) of the 2015 MLS SuperDraft by the Houston Dynamo.  He made his professional debut on March 28, coming on as a 69th-minute substitute during a 0–0 draw against the Colorado Rapids. He got his first start for the Dynamo on June 17 in a 2–0 win over the Austin Aztex in a U.S. Open Cup match.  During his first season as a pro, Steinberger made 3 MLS and 3 Open Cup appearances for the Dynamo.

Steinberger also spent time on loan with NASL club Indy Eleven during 2015.  He made his debut for Indy on August 1 in a 0–0 draw with the Atlanta Silverbacks.  On September 5, Steinberger scored twice in a 3–0 win over the Jacksonville Armada.  He ended his time on loan with Indy having scored twice from 12 appearances.

The 2016 season saw Steinberger make only 1 Open Cup appearance for the Dynamo, spending most of the year on loan.  He made 4 appearances for Houston's USL affiliate Rio Grande Valley FC before being loaned to NASL club Jacksonville Armada on June 29.  He made his debut for Jacksonville on July 2, scoring once in a 1–1 draw with the Tampa Bay Rowdies.  On October 30, Steinberger scored once and had 2 assists to help the Armada defeat Tampa Bay 3–2 in the final game of the season.  He scored 4 goals and had 4 assists from 20 appearances during his time on loan in jacksonville.

On November 28, 2016, Steinberger had his contract option declined by Houston.

Jacksonville Armada 
On February 17, 2017, Steinberger signed with Jacksonville Armada.  He scored his first goal of the season on April 8 to give the Armada a 1–0 win over FC Edmonton.  On May 7, Steinberger scored off a volley in the 95th minute to give Jacksonville a 1–1 draw with the New York Cosmos.  The goal was later named NASL Goal of the year.  He scored twice and added an assist on May 20 to help the Armada beat the San Francisco Deltas 3–0.  In Jacksonville's next game, Steinberger scored another brace to beat North Carolina FC 2–1.  He ended the season with 8 goals and 1 assists from 32 appearances in NASL play.

Indy Eleven 
Steinberger signed with USL side Indy Eleven for the 2018 season on January 31, 2018.  On March 24, in the opening game of the season, Steinberger started and played the full 90 in a 1–0 win over the Richmond Kickers.  He scored his first goal of the season on May 19 in a 2–1 loss to Bethlehem Steel.  Steinberger made 17 appearances, scored 1 goal, and had 1 assist in league play for Indy during the 2018 season.

On August 24, 2018, Steinberger was loaned to USL team North Carolina FC for the remainder of the 2018 season.  He made his debut for NCFC on August 25, scoring twice and adding an assist in a 6–2 victory over the Charlotte Independence.  He scored 4 goals and had 3 assists in 10 appearances for North Carolina as they finished 9th in the Eastern Conference, missing out on the USL Playoffs by 2 points.

Tampa Bay Rowdies 
On December 5, 2018, Steinberger joined USL Championship side Tampa Bay Rowdies.  He made his Rowdies debut on March 9 in a 1–0 win over Memphis 901.  Steinberger scored his first goal for Tampa Bay on March 16 in a 2–0 victory against the Pittsburgh Riverhounds.  He ended the USL regular season with 21 appearances, 3 goals, and 2 assists, helping the Rowdies finish 5th in the Eastern Conference and qualify for the playoffs.  Steinberger came off the bench in Tampa Bay's only playoff game, a 2–1 loss to Louisville City.  In Open Cup play, Steinberger had 1 goal and 2 assists from 2 appearances.

During a shortened 2020 regular season due to the COVID-19 pandemic, Steinberger made 8 appearances and had 2 assists to help Tampa Bay qualify for the playoffs.  On October 10, Steinberger recorded an assist in a 4–2 win over Birmingham Legion in the Conference quarterfinals.  In the Conference semifinal, he set up Lucky Mkosana in the 79th minute to give the Rowdies a 1–0 win against the Charleston Battery.  Steinberger scored on October 24 to help Tampa Bay defeat Louisville City 2–1 in the Conference final.  The USL Championship Final was cancelled due to multiple Rowdies players and staff testing positive for COVID-19.

Following the 2021 season it was announced that Steinberger would leave the Rowdies. Steinberger announced his retirement from professional soccer in February 2022.

Career statistics

References

External links

Butler Bulldogs bio
Zach Steinberger Pro Statistics

1992 births
Living people
American soccer players
Butler Bulldogs men's soccer players
Flint City Bucks players
Houston Dynamo FC players
Indy Eleven players
Rio Grande Valley FC Toros players
Jacksonville Armada FC players
North Carolina FC players
Tampa Bay Rowdies players
Association football midfielders
Soccer players from San Diego
Houston Dynamo FC draft picks
USL League Two players
Major League Soccer players
North American Soccer League players
USL Championship players